Yuki Sato may refer to:

, Japanese actor
, Japanese footballer
, Japanese long-distance runner
, Japanese softball player
, Japanese voice actor
, Japanese professional wrestler